Sir Thomas Twisden, 3rd Baronet (10 November 1668 – 12 September 1728) was a British Tory Member of Parliament and lawyer.

Twisden went to the Inner Temple. He was a Member of Parliament (MP) for Kent from 1722 to 1727.

He died aged 59.

References

1728 deaths
1668 births
British MPs 1722–1727
Members of the Parliament of Great Britain for English constituencies
Baronets in the Baronetage of England
Members of the Inner Temple